Gao Huaze (born 20 October 1997) is a Chinese footballer who currently plays for Chinese Super League side Hebei China Fortune.

Club career
Gao Huaze joined Chinese Super League side Hangzhou Greentown's youth academy in 2008. He made a brief trial with Serie A side ChievoVerona in December 2015. Gao was promoted to Hangzhou Greentown's first team squad in 2016. He didn't play for the club in the 2016 season as Hangzhou Greentown struggled at the bottom of the league and relegated to the second tier. On 12 March 2017, he made his senior debut in a 3–2 home win over Nei Mongol Zhongyou. He scored his first senior goal on 6 May 2017 in a 3–2 away win against Beijing Enterprises. He scored the second goal of the season on 11 June 2017 in a 1–1 home draw against Shijiazhuang Ever Bright. Gao made 12 appearances and scored two goals in the first 18 matches of 2017 season. He absented the rest of the season for the 2017 National Games of China.

Gao transferred to Chinese Super League side Hebei China Fortune on 28 February 2018. On 11 March 2018, he made his debut for the club in a 3–2 away win over Guizhou Hengfeng, coming on as a substitute for Xu Tianyuan in the 92nd minute. On 2 August 2018, he scored his first goal for the club in a 6–3 away defeat against Beijing Sinobo Guoan.

Career statistics
.

References

External links
 

1997 births
Living people
Chinese footballers
People from Jingzhou
Footballers from Hubei
Zhejiang Professional F.C. players
Hebei F.C. players
China League One players
Chinese Super League players
Association football forwards